Bloomfield Township is a township in Crawford County, Pennsylvania, United States. The population was 1,867 at the 2020 census.

History
Bloomfield Township was cut out of Oil Creek Township in 1811 and named for Thomas Bloomfield, an early settler in the area.  The boundaries as they are known to exist were formed in 1829.

Geography
Bloomfield Township is in northeastern Crawford County, bordered to the north by Erie County. The township includes the unincorporated communities of Lincolnville, Riceville, and Canadohta Lake, a residential community around the lake of the same name.

Natural features
Geologic Province: Northwestern Glaciated Plateau
Lowest Elevation:  where Oil Creek flows southward from the township.
Highest Elevation:  in Shreve Ridge at the Crawford-Erie county line
Places of high elevation: Shreve Ridge  and Dutch Hill 
Major Rivers/Streams and Watersheds: Oil Creek, Muddy Creek, and South Branch French Creek
Minor Rivers/Streams and Watersheds: 
     Oil Creek tributaries (Most of the township): Mosey Run, West Shreve Run, East Shreve Run and Bloomfield Run, and its tributary, Pine Hollow Run
     Muddy Creek tributaries (southwestern part of township): Federal Run and its tributary, Little Federal Run
     South Branch French Creek tributaries (extreme northeastern part of township): Hungry Run and unnamed tributaries
Lakes and Waterbodies: Lake Canadohta (Glacial Lake)
Biological Diversity Areas: Lake Canadohta BDA and Little Federal Run Headwaters BDA

Demographics

As of the census of 2000, there were 2,051 people, 757 households, and 560 families residing in the township.  The population density was 54.0 people per square mile (20.8/km).  There were 1,467 housing units at an average density of 38.6/sq mi (14.9/km).  The racial makeup of the township was 99.12% White, 0.24% African American, 0.05% Native American, 0.05% Asian, and 0.54% from two or more races. Hispanic or Latino of any race were 0.34% of the population.

There were 757 households, out of which 32.0% had children under the age of 18 living with them, 62.7% were married couples living together, 6.3% had a female householder with no husband present, and 26.0% were non-families. 20.6% of all households were made up of individuals, and 7.7% had someone living alone who was 65 years of age or older.  The average household size was 2.68 and the average family size was 3.08.

In the township the population was spread out, with 27.6% under the age of 18, 7.3% from 18 to 24, 28.2% from 25 to 44, 23.5% from 45 to 64, and 13.4% who were 65 years of age or older.  The median age was 36 years. For every 100 females, there were 104.7 males.  For every 100 females age 18 and over, there were 106.5 males.

The median income for a household in the township was $36,307, and the median income for a family was $41,250. Males had a median income of $30,639 versus $22,250 for females. The per capita income for the township was $15,303.  About 8.0% of families and 13.3% of the population were below the poverty line, including 16.8% of those under age 18 and 12.0% of those age 65 or over.

References

External links
 Bloomfield Township from Crawford County Website
 History of Bloomfield Township, Crawford County, Pennsylvania
 Bloomfield Township (Crawford County, PA) Comprehensive Plan

Townships in Crawford County, Pennsylvania
Townships in Pennsylvania